Stephen Gilbert, Lord Gilbert of Panteg (born 24 July 1963) is a British Conservative politician and member of the House of Lords.

Gilbert was brought up in Pontypool and became active in politics in the town. After attending West Monmouth School he worked in Cwmbran and soon became involved in local politics.

He said in an interview: "I saw in Pontypool that politics was about public service. It was a Labour town but with an active Conservative Party and thriving community organisations.

"I saw that so often the same people who were involved in the stuffing of envelopes for political parties one day would be at the counter of the charity shop the next. I felt then, as I do now, that getting involved in and working for any political party and fighting for your beliefs is valuable, decent and honourable."

Gilbert first came into the Conservative Party with the old cadre of Tory officials, under the doyenne of Conservative elections Sir Tony Garrett, who headed the Conservative Party's national network of organizers on the ground in the 1990s. Jo-Anne Nadler, a Conservative Party biographer, described Gilbert as "unquestionably the most long-serving and experienced member of the in-house campaign team."

He served as Deputy Chairman of the Conservative Party until 2015. He decided to step down in November 2016, when he took up a part-time position at Populus, the official polling company for the main campaign to keep Britain in the EU, a move that is said to have infuriated Tory Eurosceptics. He resigned from his position, citing his "respect" for the party. Gilbert had also served as political secretary to David Cameron during his premiership, where he acted as the link between No. 10 and the Conservative Party.

Having played a key role in the 2015 general election, Cameron nominated him to the House of Lords, where he was created a life peer on 30 September 2015, taking the title Baron Gilbert of Panteg, of Panteg in the County of Monmouthshire.

Gilbert is an honorary member of the Carlton Club. He is sole director of Stephen Gilbert Consulting.

References

1963 births
Living people
Conservative Party (UK) life peers
Life peers created by Elizabeth II